is a Japanese television miniseries produced by Tsuburaya Productions, aired during the ending segment of the New Ultraman Retsuden programming block on TV Tokyo. The official YouTube Channel of Tsuburaya Productions aired this miniseries legally with each episode that was uploaded to the Tsuburaya Productions YouTube Channel being deleted a week after their initial upload. It was available in regions that are currently region locked such as the United States. In promotion to the 2-part episodes 13 and 14 of Ultraman X, which features the crossover with the cast of Ultraman Ginga S, the Tsuburaya YouTube channel decided to re-aired a full episode instead of miniseries cuts, retaining the original subtitle. However, this video (like the first miniseries cut) was limited until it would be locked in October 24, 2015.

A DVD release of the miniseries was sold online and pre-orders were available to be made on the Japanese site of Amazon.com until December 16, 2015.\

Currently a newly released English dub of Ultra Fight Victory is airing on Tsuburaya Productions’s YouTube Channel. This new dub is a joint effort between William Winckler Productions and Tsuburaya Productions. The new president of Tsuburaya Productions stated that trying to introduce a foreign audience such as the West to Ultraman would prove to be quite difficult. It is not impossible as he stated that making a new Ultraman with homages to past Ultramans to appeal to foreign audiences is indeed possible. However, Ultra Fight Victory is not a new property. What seems to have occurred is that Tsubruaya Productions has drastically changed their plans to appeal to international audiences. This new English dub of Ultra Fight Victory is a new venture in Tsuburaya Productions’s efforts to appeal to those who use online content and streaming platforms in foreign countries.

Story

Sometime after the previous event, Sho and Sakuya returned to the Victorian Kingdom during their break from working with the UPG. Their reunion with Lepi was short-lived when the party was dragged underground by the monster Aribunta and its master, Yapool, who steals the Victorium Core. While Sho as Ultraman Victory was left powerless to stop Aribunta, a blue Ultraman named Ultraman Hikari saved him, granting the Knight Timbre, which allows Victory to achieve a new form called Ultraman Victory Knight and finishes Aribunta. As Hikari narrates, in tens of thousands of years, the Space Emperor revives himself through a space distortion that can be felt from the whole galaxy. Ultraman King sent three Ultramen, Ultraman Ace, Ultraman Leo, and Astra to stop him. Hikari invented the Knight Timbre as a means to seal the Emperor's darkness.

With Ultraman Victory's battle tactics uploaded by Yapool, Ace Killer becomes Victory Killer and pummels the Ultraman into submission. Even with Victory Knight's arrival, Yapool already sent Lunatyx to take care of the captured Ginga until Shepherdon, who was revived by Sho, turns the tables and defeated them before healing Ginga and Ace. The three Ultras joined the Leo Brothers on Guar and Yapool likewise joined his Super Beast after delivering the Victorium Core to the Space Emperor. Ginga and Victory used the Ultraman Ginga Victory combination and defeated Yapool but in his dying breath, delivered the last of his energy to the distortion. The emperor, Juda Spectre, fully revives and sent his monster, Super Grand King Spectre to deal with the Ultras. Victory left Grand King to the rest of his comrades while he assumes Victory Knight again and fought Juda. Eventually, his refusal to surrender awakened the Victorium Core, which instead of weakening Juda and Super Grand King Spectre, allowed the Ultras to finish them.

Using the Knight Timbre for the final time, Victory returns the Victorium Core to the Earth and Victorium Kingdom. Hikari congratulated Sho and Hikaru over a good job. The former tried to return the Knight Timbre but Hikari refused, ensuring the Earth's future would be safe in their hands.

Cast
: 
: 
: 
: 
: 
, KillerTrance Voice: 
: 
: 
: 
:

Songs
Opening theme

Lyrics: 
Composition & Arrangement: 
Artist: Voyager with Hikaru Raidō (Takuya Negishi) & Show (Kiyotaka Uji) feat. Takamiy
During the airing of full episode Ultra Fight Victory, this song was used as the ending theme in place of Kirameku Mirai ~Yume no Ginga e~.
Ending theme

Lyrics: 
Composition & Arrangement: Takao Konishi
Artist: Voyager feat. Ultraman Ginga (Tomokazu Sugita)
Insert theme

Lyrics: 
Composition & Arrangement: 
Artist: , 

Lyrics: 
Composition & Arrangement: 
Artist: Ryu Manatsu, 

Lyrics: Hideki Tama, Kiyoshi Okazaki
Composition & Arrangement: Takao Konishi
Artist: Voyager with Hikaru Raidō (Takuya Negishi) & Show (Kiyotaka Uji) feat. Takamiy

See also
 Ultra Series - Complete list of official Ultraman-related shows

References

External links
Ultra Fight Victory at Tsuburaya Productions 

2015 Japanese television series debuts
Ultra television series
Crossover tokusatsu television series
TV Tokyo original programming